The du Bois sign is a medical finding of shortness of the little finger in congenital syphilis.

References

Musculoskeletal disorders